Mangelia hiradoensis is a species of sea snail, a marine gastropod mollusk in the family Mangeliidae.

Description

Distribution
This marine species occurs off Japan.

References

 Makiyama, Jiro. "Molluscan fauna of the lower part of the Kakegawa Series in the province of Totomi, Japan." Memoirs of the College of Science, Kyoto Imperial University 3.1 (1927): 1–147.

External links
  Tucker, J.K. 2004 Catalog of recent and fossil turrids (Mollusca: Gastropoda). Zootaxa 682:1–1295.

hiradoensis
Gastropods described in 1927